The Chinook salmon  (Oncorhynchus tshawytscha) is the largest and most valuable species of Pacific salmon in North America, as well as the largest in the genus Oncorhynchus. Its common name is derived from the Chinookan peoples. Other vernacular names for the species include king salmon, Quinnat salmon, Tsumen, spring salmon, chrome hog, Blackmouth, and Tyee salmon. The scientific species name is based on the Russian common name chavycha (чавыча).

Chinook are anadromous fish native to the North Pacific Ocean and the river systems of western North America, ranging from California to Alaska, as well as Asian rivers ranging from northern Japan to the Palyavaam River in Arctic northeast Siberia. They have been introduced to other parts of the world, including New Zealand and Patagonia. Introduced Chinook salmon are thriving in Lake Michigan and Michigan's western rivers. A large Chinook is a prized and sought-after catch for a sporting angler. The flesh of the salmon is also highly valued for its dietary nutritional content, which includes high levels of important omega-3 fatty acids. Some populations are endangered; however, many are healthy. The Chinook salmon has not been assessed for the IUCN Red List. According to NOAA, the Chinook salmon population along the California coast is declining from factors such as overfishing, loss of freshwater and estuarine habitat, hydropower development, poor ocean conditions, and hatchery practices.

Distribution

Natural range
Historically, the native distribution of Chinook salmon in North America ranged from the Ventura River in California in the south to Kotzebue Sound in Alaska in the north. Recent studies have shown that Chinook salmon are historically native to the Guadalupe River (California) watershed, the southernmost major metropolitan area hosting salmon runs in the United States. Populations have disappeared from large areas where they once flourished, however, or shrunk by as much as 40 percent. In some regions, their inland range has been cut off, mainly by dams and habitat alterations: in Southern California, in some areas east of the Coast Ranges of California and Oregon, and in large areas in the Snake River and upper Columbia River drainage basins. In certain areas such as California's Sacramento–San Joaquin River Delta, it was revealed that extremely low numbers of juvenile Chinook salmon (less than 1%) were surviving.

In the western Pacific, the distribution ranges from northern Japan (Hokkaido) in the south to the Arctic Ocean as far as the East Siberian Sea and Palyavaam River in the north. Nevertheless, they are consistently present and the distribution is well known only in Kamchatka. Elsewhere, information is scarce, but they have a patchy presence in the Anadyr River basin and parts of the Chukchi Peninsula. Also, in parts of the northern Magadan Oblast near the Shelikhov Gulf and Penzhina Bay, stocks might persist but remain poorly studied.

Introduced populations
In 1967, the Michigan Department of Natural Resources introduced Chinook into Lake Michigan and Lake Huron to control the alewife, an invasive species of nuisance fish from the Atlantic Ocean. In the 1960s, alewives constituted 90% of the biota in these lakes. Coho salmon had been introduced the year before, and the program was successful. Chinook and Coho salmon thrived on the alewives and spawned in the lakes' tributaries. After this success, Chinook were introduced into the other Great Lakes, where sport fishermen prize them for their aggressive behaviour on the hook.

The species has also established itself in Patagonian waters in South America, where both introduced and escaped hatchery fish have colonized rivers and established stable spawning runs. The population is thought to be derived from a single stocking of juveniles in the lower river around 1930.

Sporadic efforts to introduce the fish to New Zealand waters in the late 19th century were largely failures and led to no evident establishments. Initially ova were imported from the Baird hatchery of the McCloud River in California. Further efforts in the early 20th century were more successful and subsequently led to the establishment of spawning runs in the rivers of Canterbury and North Otago: Rangitata River, the Opihi River, the Ashburton River, the Rakaia River, the Waimakariri River, the Hurunui River, and the Waiau Uwha River. The success of the latter introductions is thought to be partly attributable to the use of ova from autumn-run populations as opposed to ova from spring-run populations used in the first attempts. Whilst other salmon have also been introduced into New Zealand, only Chinook salmon (or king salmon as it is known locally in New Zealand) have established sizeable pelagic runs.

Description

The Chinook is blue-green, red, or purple on the back and on the top of the head, with silvery sides and white ventral surfaces. It has black spots on its tail and the upper half of its body. Although spots are seen on the tail in pink salmon and silver on the tail in coho and chum salmon, Chinook are unique among the Pacific salmon in combining black spots and silver on the tail. Another distinctive feature is a black gum line that is present in both salt and fresh water. The meat can be either pink or white, depending on what the salmon have been feeding on.

Chinook salmon are the largest of the Pacific salmon. In the Kenai River of Alaska, mature Chinook averaged . The current sport-caught world record, was caught on May 17, 1985, in the Kenai River. The commercial catch world record is  caught near Rivers Inlet, British Columbia, in the late 1970s.

Life cycle

Chinook may spend one to eight years in the ocean (averaging from three to four years) before returning to their home rivers to spawn. The salmon undergo radical morphological changes as they prepare for the spawning event ahead. Salmon lose the silvery blue they had as ocean fish, and their color darkens, sometimes with a radical change in hue. Salmon are sexually dimorphic, and the male salmon develop canine-like teeth, and their jaws develop a pronounced curve or hook called a "kype." Studies have shown that larger and more dominant male salmon have a reproductive advantage as female Chinook are often more aggressive toward smaller males.

Chinook spawn in larger and deeper waters than other salmon species and can be found on the spawning redds (nests) from September to December. The female salmon may lay her eggs in four to five nesting pockets within a redd. After laying eggs, females guard the redd from four to 25 days before dying, while males seek additional mates. Chinook eggs hatch 90 to 150 days after deposition, depending upon water temperature. Egg deposits are timed to ensure the young salmon fry emerge during an appropriate season for survival and growth. Fry and parr (young fish) usually stay in fresh water for 12 to 18 months before traveling downstream to estuaries, where they remain as smolts for several months. Some Chinook return to fresh water one or two years earlier than their counterparts and are referred to as "jack" salmon.

Since Chinook rely on fat reserves for energy upon re-entering fresh water, commercial fish caught here are highly prized for their unusually high levels of heart-healthy omega-3 fatty acids. However, the high costs of harvest and transport from this rural area limits its affordability. The highest elevation Chinook spawn is in the Middle Fork and Upper Salmon River in Idaho.

Chinook eat amphipods and other crustaceans and insects while young, and primarily other fish when older. Young salmon feed in streambeds for a short period until they are strong enough to journey out to the ocean and acquire more food. Chinook juveniles divide into two types: ocean-type and stream-type. Ocean-type Chinook migrate to salt water in their first year. Stream-type salmon spend one full year in fresh water before migrating to the ocean. After a few years in the ocean, adult salmon, then large enough to escape most predators, return to their natal streambeds to mate. Chinook can have extended lifespans, in which some fish spend one to five years in the ocean, reaching age eight. More northerly populations tend to have longer lives.

Salmon need suitable spawning habitat. Clean, cool, oxygenated, sediment-free fresh water is essential for egg development. Chinook use larger sediment (gravel) sizes for spawning than other Pacific salmon. Riparian vegetation and woody debris help juvenile salmon by providing cover and maintaining low water temperatures.

Chinook also need healthy ocean habitats. Juvenile salmon grow in clean, productive estuarine environments and gain the energy for migration. Later, they change physiologically to live in salt water. They rely on eelgrass and seaweeds for camouflage (protection from predators), shelter, and foraging habitat as they make their way to the open ocean. Adult fish need a rich, open ocean habitat to acquire the strength needed to travel back upstream, escape predators, and reproduce before dying. In his book King of Fish, David Montgomery writes, "The reserves of fish at sea are important to restocking rivers disturbed by natural catastrophes." Thus, it is vitally important for the fish to reach the oceans to grow into healthy adult fish to sustain the species without being impeded by man-made structures such as dams.

The bodies of water for salmon habitat must be clean and oxygenated. One sign of high productivity and growth rate in the oceans is the level of algae. Increased algal levels lead to higher levels of carbon dioxide in the water, which transfers into living organisms, fostering underwater plants and small organisms, which salmon eat. Algae can filter high levels of toxins and pollutants. Thus, it is essential for algae and other water-filtering agents not to be destroyed in the oceans because they contribute to the well-being of the food chain.

With some populations endangered, precautions are necessary to prevent overfishing and habitat destruction, including appropriate management of hydroelectric and irrigation projects. If too few fish remain because of fishing and land management practices, salmon have more difficulty reproducing. When one of these factors is compromised, affected stock can decline. One Seattle Times article states, "Pacific salmon have disappeared from 40 percent of their historic range outside Alaska," and concludes it is imperative for people to realize the needs of salmon and try not to contribute to destructive practices that harm salmon runs.

In the Pacific Northwest, the summer runs of especially large Chinook once common (before dams and overfishing led to declines) were known as June hogs.

A Chinook's birthplace and later evolution can be tracked by looking at its otolith (ear) bone. The bone can record the chemical composition of the water the fish had lived in, just as a tree's growth rings provide hints about dry and wet years. The bone is built with the chemical signature of the environment that hosted the fish. Researchers were able to tell where different individuals of Chinook were born and lived in the first year of their lives. Testing was done by measuring the strontium in the bones. Strontium can accurately show researchers the exact location and time of a fish swimming in a river.

Fishing industry

Wild capture

The total North Pacific fisheries harvest of the Chinook salmon in 2010 was some 1.4 million fish, corresponding to 7,000 tonnes; 1.1 million of the fish were captured in the United States, and others were divided by Canada and Russia. The share of Chinook salmon from the total commercial Pacific salmon harvest was less than 1% by weight and only about 0.3% of the number of fish. The trend has been down in the captures compared to the period before 1990, when the total harvest had been around 25,000 tonnes. Global production has, however, remained at a stable level because of increased aquaculture.

Aquaculture

The world's largest producer and market supplier of Chinook salmon is New Zealand. In 2009, New Zealand exported  of Chinook salmon, marketed as king salmon, equating to a value of NZ$61 million in export earnings. For the year ended March 2011, this amount had increased to NZ$85 million. New Zealand accounts for about half of the global production of Chinook salmon, and about half of New Zealand's production is exported. Japan is New Zealand's largest export market, with stock also being supplied to other countries of the Pacific Rim, including Australia.

Farming of the species in New Zealand began in the 1970s when hatcheries were initially set up to enhance and support wild fish stocks, with the first commercial operations starting in 1976. After some opposition against their establishment by societal groups, including anglers, the first sea cage farm was established in 1983 at Big Glory Bay in Stewart Island by British Petroleum NZ Ltd.
The broodstock for the farms is usually selected from existing farm stock or sometimes sourced from wild populations. Eggs and milt are stripped manually from sexually mature salmon and incubated under conditions replicating the streams and rivers where the salmon would spawn naturally (at around ). After hatching, the baby salmon are typically grown to the smolt stage (around six months of age) before they are transferred to the sea cages or ponds. Most sea cage farming occurs in the Marlborough Sounds, Stewart Island, and Akaroa Harbour, while freshwater operations in Canterbury, Otago, and Tasman use ponds, raceways, and hydro canals for growout operations.
Low stocking densities, ranging between less than 1 kg/m3 and around 25 kg/m3 (depending on the life stage of the salmon), and the absence of disease in the fish mean New Zealand farmers do not need to use antibiotics or vaccines to maintain the health of their salmon stocks. The salmon are fed food pellets of fish meal specially formulated for Chinook salmon (typical proportions of the feed are: 45% protein, 22% fat, and 14% carbohydrate plus ash and water) that contain no steroids or other growth enhancers.

Regulations and monitoring programmes ensure salmon are farmed in a sustainable manner. The planning and approval process for new salmon farms in New Zealand considers the farm's potential environmental effects, its effects on fishing activities (if it is a marine farm), and any possible cultural and social effects. In the interest of fish welfare, a number of New Zealand salmon farming operations anaesthetise salmon before slaughter using Aqui-S™, an organically based anaesthetic developed in New Zealand that is safe for use in food and that has been favourably reported on by the British Humane Slaughter Association. In recognition of the sustainable, environmentally conscious practices, the New Zealand salmon farming industry has been acknowledged as the world's greenest by the Global Aquaculture Performance Index.

Chile is the only country other than New Zealand currently producing significant quantities of farmed Chinook salmon. The United States has not produced farmed Chinook in commercial quantities since 1994. In Canada, most commercial Chinook salmon farming ceased by 2009.

Management

Pacific coast 

Fisheries in the U.S. and Canada are limited by impacts to weak and endangered salmon runs. Nine populations of Chinook salmon are listed under the U.S. Endangered Species Act (ESA) as either threatened or endangered. In the Snake River, Spring/Summer Chinook and Fall Chinook are ESA listed as Threatened. The fall and late-fall runs in the Central Valley population in California is a U.S. National Marine Fisheries Service (NMFS) species of concern.

In April 2008, commercial fisheries in both Oregon and California were closed in response to the low count of Chinook salmon present because of the collapse of the Sacramento River run, one of the biggest south of the Columbia. In April 2009, California again canceled the season. The Pacific Fishery Management Council's goal for the Sacramento River run is an escapement total (fish that return to freshwater spawn areas and hatcheries) of 122,000–180,000 fish. The 2007 escapement was estimated at 88,000, and the 2008 estimate was 66,000 fish. Scientists from universities and federal, state, and tribal agencies concluded the 2004 and 2005 broods were harmed by poor ocean conditions in 2005 and 2006, in addition to "a long-term, steady degradation of the freshwater and estuarine environment." Such conditions included weak upwelling, warm sea surface temperatures, and low densities of food.

In Oregon, the 2010 spring Chinook run was forecast to increase by up to 150% over 2009 populations, growing from 200,000 to over 500,000, making this the largest run in recorded history. Lower temperatures in 2008 North Pacific waters brought in fatter plankton, which, along with greater outflows of Columbia River water, fed the resurgent populations. The Oregon Department of Fish and Wildlife estimated 80% were hatchery-born. Chinook runs in other habitats have not recovered proportionately.

In April 2016, Coleman National Fish Hatchery outside of Red Bluff, California, released 12 million juvenile Chinook salmon, with many salmon being tagged for monitoring. The release was done in hopes of helping restore the salmon population of Battle Creek.

In June 2021, the California State Water Resources Control Board approved a plan by the United States Bureau of Reclamation to release water from Lake Shasta for irrigation use, which "significantly" increased the risk of extinction of winter-run Chinook in the Sacramento River.

Lake Michigan 
Introduced Chinook salmon in Lake Michigan are sought after by tourists enjoying chartered fishing trips. A 2016 survey of Wisconsin anglers found they would, on average, pay $140 for a trip to catch Chinook salmon, $90 for lake trout, and $180 for walleye. Should the Chinook salmon fishery collapse and be replaced with a native lake trout fishery, the economic value would decrease by 80%.

Recent data 
Since the later 1970s, the size and age range of Chinook salmon have been declining according to studies along the northwest Pacific coast from Alaska to California for the years of 1977 to 2015 which examined about 1.5 million Chinook salmon. Ocean-5 Chinook (which means the fish has spent five years in the ocean) have declined from being up to 3–5% of the population to being almost none. Ocean-4 chinook are also seeing a rapid decline in their population. This means that Chinook are not living as long as they used to. This trend has mostly been seen in Alaska, but also Oregon and Washington.

New trends have also been seen regarding the size of Ocean-1, 2, 3, 4, and 5 from 1975 to 2015. The size of Chinook who have spent one and two years in the ocean has been rising, while the size of Chinook of three to five years has been declining. The size increase was seen mainly in hatchery fish, not wild, and hatchery fish were often larger than wild, but the decrease was seen in both types of populations. Factors have been discovered that have influenced the size of the Chinook. They include, but are not limited to, the years they spent in fresh water before migrating to the ocean, the time of year they were caught, which season run they participated in, and where they were caught. However, what is causing these negative trends is still not fully known or researched. Some possibilities can be climate change, pollution, and fishing practices.

In California specifically, Chinook populations in the rivers have been declining. Chinook that are migratory are already more vulnerable, and the California drought made them even more vulnerable. A study was done specifically on the California Delta over three years, and it was discovered that the Chinook salmon had a low survival rate for different reasons, and as a result, the Chinook salmon population here has been on a decline. Some of the factors affecting the populations include the route used during migration, drought conditions, the amount of snowmelt, and infrastructure that affects the flow of water (such as dams and levees). Each of these factors has significantly impacted Chinook survival rates, as most have made it more challenging for Chinook to travel from their spawning grounds to the ocean and back. The fluctuation of water depth as well as temperature have made this more challenging, and as a result, Chinook populations are declining. Which rivers or streams the Chinook are in highly impacts their survival rates, as some, like the Chinook in the Fraser River, only have a 30% survival rate. More studies and actions are needed for there to be an impact on the survival rates of the Chinook. Due to many of these reasons, the National Wildlife Federation has listed Chinook populations as endangered or threatened.

Cultural aspects

The Chinook salmon is spiritually and culturally prized among certain First Nations peoples. For tribes on the Northwest coast, salmon were an important part of their culture for spiritual reasons and food. Many celebrate the first spring Chinook caught each year with "first-salmon ceremonies." While salmon fishing in general remains important economically for many tribal communities, it is especially the Chinook harvest that is typically the most valuable. The relation to salmon for the tribes in this area is similar to how other tribes relied more on buffalo for food, and have many legends and spiritual ties to them.

Chinook salmon were described and enthusiastically eaten by the Lewis and Clark Expedition. Lewis wrote that, when fresh, they tasted better than any other fish he had ever eaten. They did not particularly like dried or "pounded" salmon. Lewis and Clark knew about Pacific salmon but had never seen one. The Western world had known about Pacific salmon since the late 18th century. Maritime fur traders and explorers, such as George Vancouver, frequently acquired salmon by trade with the indigenous people of the Northwest coast. Lewis and Clark first encountered Chinook salmon as a gift from Chief Cameahwait, on August 13, 1805, near Lemhi Pass. Tasting it convinced Lewis they had crossed the continental divide.

In Oregon, the Klamath tribes have lived along the Klamath river, and the Chinook salmon have been a large part of their lives. An Indian legend of a tribe on the Klamath river describes how the construction of the dam has hurt the fish population and that the impact on them has gone unnoticed, and the destruction of the dam is what has brought back their food supply and made them happy again. The Klamath tribe had a similar legend that has illustrated the importance of not messing up the Chinook salmon migration. The legend described three Skookums which can be related to the three dams on the Klamath river in California. It has been known that the creation of dams has negatively impacted the lives of many Native American Indians by disrupting their food supply and the flow of water. The impact on the salmon migration has been seen by not only tribal members but others as well, and as a result, progress is slowly being made to help restore the salmon habitats along the river. It has been known that for many tribes Chinook salmon have played an important role, spiritually and physically.

Other tribes, including the Nuxalk, Kwakiutl, and Kyuquot, relied primarily on Chinook to eat. Known as the "king salmon" in Alaska for its large size and flavorful flesh, the Chinook is the state fish of this state, and of Oregon.

References

Further reading
 
 
 Christie, Patrick. Lecture. 22 April 2005. Vashon-Maury Islands Case Study: Incompatible Desires? Growth and Maintaining Salmon Populations in Puget Sound. University of Washington; Seattle, WA.
 Montgomery, David. King of Fish: The Thousand-Year Run of Salmon. Boulder, CO: Westview Press, 2003.
 Chinook salmon NOAA FishWatch. Retrieved 4 November 2012.

External links

 Fish Passage Center, monitoring salmon spawning and migration
 ESA Chinook Listings
 Potential causes of size trends in Yukon River chinook salmon populations / prepared by the United States and Canada Yukon River Joint Technical Committee, Salmon Size Subcommittee. Hosted by the Alaska State Publications Program.
 Spawning abundance of chinook salmon in the Chickamin River in 2004 / by Glenn M. Freeman, Scott A. McPherson, and Daniel J. Reed. Hosted by Alaska State Publications Program

Chinook salmon
Freshwater fish of the Arctic
Commercial fish
Fish of the Bering Sea
Fauna of the Northwestern United States
Symbols of Oregon
Chinook salmon
Salmon
Taxa named by Johann Julius Walbaum